Events from the year 1773 in Ireland.

Incumbent
Monarch: George III

Events
Formation of Volunteer corps: the First Magherafelt Volunteers (June); and the Offerlane Blues (10 October).

Arts and literature
15 March – first performance of Oliver Goldsmith's comedy She Stoops to Conquer at the Covent Garden Theatre in London.
4 May – Eibhlín Dubh Ní Chonaill (Eileen O' Connell) composes the keen Caoineadh Airt Uí Laoghaire over the body of her husband Art Ó Laoghaire.
Thomas Leland publishes The History of Ireland, from the invasion of Henry II.

Births
23 July – Abraham Colles, professor of Anatomy, Surgery and Physiology at the Royal College of Surgeons in Ireland (died 1843).
19 August – Valentine Lawless, 2nd Baron Cloncurry, politician (died 1853).
19 November – Robert Arbuthnot, British military officer (died 1853).
22 November – John George de la Poer Beresford, Archbishop of Armagh (Church of Ireland) (died 1862).
Full date unknown
William Beatty, Ship's Surgeon on  during the Battle of Trafalgar (died 1842).
Edward Bunting, musician (died 1843).
John Shaw, Captain in the United States Navy (died 1823).

Deaths
17 April – Arthur Gore, 1st Earl of Arran, politician (born 1703).
19 November – Charles Clinton, French and Indian War Colonel (born 1690.
19 November – James FitzGerald, 1st Duke of Leinster, politician (born 1722).

References

 
Years of the 18th century in Ireland
Ireland
1770s in Ireland